This article includes the stage credits of Michael Ball. Listed are all theatre roles and special events in chronological order.

Theatre

Special Events

References 

English male musical theatre actors
English male stage actors